Sonny King (April 1, 1922 – February 3, 2006) was an American lounge singer of Italian descent.

He was born as Luigi Antonio Schiavone on April 1, 1922, in Brooklyn, New York. He was the sidekick of Jimmy Durante for 28 years until Durante's death in 1980. They appeared together on The Ed Sullivan Show five times in the 1960s. King shared a New York apartment with Dean Martin when the two were struggling entertainers, and is credited with introducing Martin to a young comedian Jerry Lewis.

Although not an official Rat Pack member, he was close friends with many Rat Pack entertainers and appeared in movies such as Robin and the Seven Hoods and Sergeants 3.  He recorded an album "For Losers Only" and shared the stage with jazz greats such as Louis Armstrong, Lena Horne, Joe Williams and many more.  King moved to Las Vegas in the early 1950s and was a fixture on the strip and local clubs until his death on February 3, 2006, from cancer. He was 83 years old.

Being brought up in vaudeville and trained in operatic vocals and comedy, all these elements composed the foundation of what became the quintessential "Vegas lounge singer" persona.

Sonny had seven children: Thomas Stephens, Michael Stephens, Craig Unger, Shannon Ward, Antoinette Schiavone, Louis Schiavone II and Christopher Schiavone.

Discography

Filmography

References 

1922 births
2006 deaths
American male film actors
Musicians from Brooklyn
People from the Las Vegas Valley
American people of Italian descent
Deaths from cancer in Nevada
20th-century American singers
20th-century American male actors
20th-century American male singers